Stavroula Antonakou (born May 2, 1982) is a retired Greek water polo player, playing as a driver, World Champion (in 2011 in Shanghai) with the Greek women's national water polo team. She was a part of the  team at the European Championships, including at the 2008, 2010 and 2012 Women's European Water Polo Championship.

At club level, she played for Olympiacos and Ethnikos, becoming captain in both teams.

Political career
As a member of The River political party, Antonakou was elected Member of the Hellenic Parliament for Piraeus A in the January 2015 elections.

See also
 List of world champions in women's water polo
 List of World Aquatics Championships medalists in water polo

References

External links
 

1982 births
Living people
Greek female water polo players
Olympic water polo players of Greece
Water polo players at the 2008 Summer Olympics
Olympiacos Women's Water Polo Team players
Greek MPs 2015 (February–August)
The River (Greece) politicians
World Aquatics Championships medalists in water polo
Water polo players from Piraeus
Politicians from Piraeus
Greek sportsperson-politicians
21st-century Greek women